Feluda, or Prodosh Chandra Mitra [Mitter], is a fictional detective, Private investigator created by famous Indian director and writer Satyajit Ray. Feluda resides at 21 Rajani Sen Road, Ballygunge, Calcutta, West Bengal. Feluda first made his appearance in a Bengali children's magazine called Sandesh in 1965, under the editorialship of Ray and Subhas Mukhopadhyay. His first adventure was Feludar Goendagiri. Feluda is one of the most impactful Bengali characters of all time.

Feluda is often accompanied by his cousin, who is also his assistant, Tapesh Ranjan Mitter (affectionately called Topshe by Feluda), who serves as the narrator of the stories. From the sixth story, Sonar Kella (The Golden Fortress), the duo are joined by a popular thriller writer Jatayu (Lalmohon Ganguli).

Feluda has had been filmed at times, with the character been played by Soumitra Chatterjee, Sabyasachi Chakrabarty, Ahmed Rubel, Shashi Kapoor, Abir Chatterjee, Parambrata Chatterjee, Tota Roy Chowdhury and Indraneil Sengupta. Satyajit Ray directed two Feluda movies — Sonar Kella (1974) and Joi Baba Felunath (1978). Sandip Ray made a new Feluda film series (continuation of the original series) on Feluda's adventures which started from Baksho Rahashya (1996). In this series he made ten TV films and six theatrical films in Bengali on the character. Sandip Ray also made a stand-alone Feluda film Badshahi Angti (2014) which was intended to be the first film of a reboot series featuring Abir Chatterjee, but the projects were ultimately shelved and Sandip Ray revived his original film series starring Sabyasachi Chakrabarty.

Character development

Inspiration from Sherlock Holmes 

Satyajit Ray had deep interests in crime fiction and he read all of Sherlock Holmes fictions in his school days. And when Ray himself started writing on crime fictions, unsurprisingly, the character Sherlock Holmes inspired his writings. Feluda's character resembles Sherlock Holmes and Tapesh/Topshe's character resembles Dr. Watson. In the stories of Feluda, he is displayed as a big admirer of Sherlock Holmes which he mentions multiple times. In Kailash Choudhury'r Pathar he praises the way Holmes used to draw large conclusions from observations. In Londone Feluda, when Feluda goes to Baker Street, he openly addresses Holmes as the "master" (Bengali: guru) of all private detectives.

Personality 
Pradosh Chandra Mitter, popularly known by his nickname Feluda, first appeared in the eponymous Bengali short story Feludar Goyendagiri (Danger in Darjeeling) in 1965. The story, written by Satyajit Ray, was published in Sandesh, a children's periodical founded by Ray's grandfather, Upendrakishore Ray Chowdhury and edited by Ray himself. In the Feluda series that followed, he was portrayed as a man of around 27 (born around 1938) with a tall (almost 6'2"), athletic figure. Despite being a strongly built man adept in martial arts, Feluda relies mostly upon his superb analytical ability and observation skill (jokingly referred to as the Magajastra or brain-weapon) to solve cases instead of using physical strength or weapons. He is very choosy about taking up cases and prefers cases that require cerebral effort. He possesses a .32 Colt revolver, but the weapon is used very infrequently and mostly for non-violent purposes. However, contemporary (2000s) movies based on Feluda stories feature scenes of violence uncharacteristic in the literature, where Feluda demonstrates his martial art prowess. A master of disguises, Feluda is known to be an adept sleight-of-hand, and he puts these skills to use to solve multiple cases. Feluda often calls a meeting after solving the mystery, where he cajoles the culprit into admitting their crime.

Personal life 
In his personal life, Feluda is a common Bengali youth who has been brought up by his father's younger brother (Tapesh/Topshe's father) after being orphaned when he was only 9. His father, the late Joykrishna Mitra, used to teach Mathematics and Sanskrit at Dhaka Collegiate School. According to the story 'Royal Bengal Rahasya', The Anchestral Home of Feluda was in SonaDighi Village of Bikrampur Region of Dhaka (Now Munshiganj District). His Elder Uncle was Manager of a Zamindari Estate in Mymensingh and a hunter. After the Partition of 1947, His family moved from Dhaka to Calcutta, On a rented house in Tara Road. Later, they moved in 21, Rajani Sen Road. Feluda had a job in bank before his detective career.  He finds an avid listener in his cousin Tapesh. He often uses his oratory skill at the climactic scenes to cajole the culprit into confessing his crime. He is an early riser and is frequently shown starting his day with exercises and yoga.

Contrary to his otherwise healthy lifestyle, Feluda enjoys smoking cigarettes and chewing betel leaves after lunch. His favourite brand of cigarettes is Charminar. He is a connoisseur of delicious food, popular music, movies, and books. He has a great appreciation for Sherlock Holmes and, according to the film Tintorettor Jishu, Bruce Lee. Similar to Sherlock Holmes, he has a voracious reading habit (reflecting that of Ray's own), which add up to his enormous general knowledge. This know-how often comes handy while socialising with people and unravelling mysteries. He always reads up about a place before visiting. He says it comes in handy sometimes. He is shown to be fond of Tintin, and specially his cousin, Topshe, is a fan of Tintin. Some of the Feluda stories and films have many references of The Adventures of Tintin. He is also a huge fan of the books by Bibhutibhushan Bandyopadhyay, Jim Corbett and Kenneth Anderson. His Favourite book was "Aranyak" written by Bibhutibhushan Bandyopadhyay. He is also shown to be fond of non-fiction books like Aku-Aku, Chariots of the Gods? and The Numerology of Dr. Matrix.

Feluda has love and respect for Lalmohan Ganguly (Jatayu) and his fictional creation Prakhar Rudra is liked by Feluda. Feluda is protective and caring about his cousin, yet he always keeps picking mistakes or humor of or from Topshe. Topshe, the narrator, greatly admires his brother and loves to be a part of his adventures. Feluda has never shown interest in any woman, and there are very few female characters in the stories or films (except some minor characters like Topshe's mother).

Other characters

Topshe 
Feluda's paternal cousin Tapesh Ranjan Mitter, who is fondly referred to as Topshe, is based on Arthur Conan Doyle's conception of Dr. John Watson. In the first couple of stories, his surname was Bose, but later it changed to Mitra. Just like the former army surgeon, Topshe is the quintessential accomplice and faithfully records each of Pradosh Mitter's exploits accurately. Topshe is a smart teenager. In the first story of Feluda series (i.e. Feludar Goyendagiri), Topshe was thirteen and a half where Feluda's age was twenty-seven, just the double of Topshe. Though Feluda often teases his young cousin, he is extremely fond and very protective of him. Feluda lives with Topshe's family. Topshe's father, Binay Mitter is the younger brother of Feluda's father, and therefore his uncle, and they all reside at 21, Rajani Sen Road, Kolkata-700029. Although there really is a 'Rajani Sen Road' in Kolkata, the house number is missing. Formerly, they all used to live in Tara road, Kolkata. Though not mentioned explicitly, Topshe is good-looking, fair, tall and handsome, as per different illustrations made by Satyajit Ray himself.

Detailed knowledge regarding Topshe's high school education is not available, but he used to go to school during the adventure of Sonar Kella (the sixth book of Feluda series). In the film adaptation of Sonar Kella, Topshe's mother shows her concern regarding his career and study as he spends much time solving cases with Feluda. By the time of Kailashe Kelenkari (the eighth book of the series) he have had his secondary examination ('Madhyamik Pariksha'). Just like Feluda, Topshe also used to read lot of books to enhance his knowledge. Topshe often gets his lessons from Feluda himself. In many cases, Feluda tests his deductive knowledge and he usually passes the test satisfactorily. In the movie  Sonar Kella Topshe's father aptly said that Topshe is a lucky boy who got Feluda as his mentor. Topshe is fond of 'Adventures of Tintin' comic series. In the book  Kailashe Kelenkari, he is found reading 'Tintin in Tibet'.

Topshe always takes an active part in Feluda's adventure. Though in most cases, he follows Feluda's instructions or indications, there are instances where he himself gets involved into some action/investigation. To mention a few, he and Jatayu (a.k.a. Lalmohan Ganguly) sneaks into a warehouse in 'Patan' (Nepal) to discover vast collection of smuggled narcotics (book Jato Kando Kathmandute); finds out the stabbed body of a missing man in the woods (book Darjeeling Jomjomat); replaces the pink pearl with a fake for safe-keeping (book Golapi Mukta Rahasya). The last incident impressed Feluda as well. However, all these activities mainly comes in the latter part of the series. He also interrogated the suspects in Apsara Theaterer Mamla when Feluda was sick and bed-ridden. Feluda solved the case just from the report of that interrogation.

In movies and TV films the character of Feluda has been played by Soumitra Chatterjee, Sabyasachi Chakrabarty and recently Abir Chatterjee, while Topshe has been played by Siddartha Chatterjee, Saswata Chatterjee, Parambrata Chattopadhyay and Saheb Bhattacharya over the years. In Sandip Ray's 2014 film Badshahi Angti, actor Sourav Das played the role.

Lalmohan Ganguli or Jatayu 

Lalmohan Ganguli is a close friend of Pradosh Chandra Mitter, and is described as the author of a series of Bengali crime thrillers written under the pseudonym 'Jatayu'. His crime stories and novels are usually derided as unbelievable, considering that his main character is always the superhero Prakhar Rudra, and in his words, Height:6 ft 3 1/2 inches, waist:36, chest:46, shoulders:22 and wrist:8 1/2. Though all his novels seem to have become best-sellers, he often tends to make extremely silly mistakes such as spelling igloos as 'ilgoos'. In Baksho Rahasya or Incident on the Kalka Mail, he confuses hippos with walruses — a tendency that Feluda often tries to correct. He sometimes serves as a perfect foil to the group and in Ray's own words provides 'dollops of humour', although he sometimes does some brave acts not expected of him. To mention a few, he knocked out goons in Baksho Rahasya, Joto Kando Kathmandute, Tintorettor Jishu and Ebar Kando Kedarnathe, which impressed Feluda as well. He owns a 'Madrasi green' Ambassador car. Jatayu makes his first appearance in Sonar Kella joining Feluda and Topshe in the train at Kanpur, on their way to Jodhpur. In the first two films on Feluda, which were directed by Ray himself, the character was played by Santosh Dutta, and after the first one, Ray modified the literary character to some extent, making him look and behave quite like Dutta himself. In the next films directed by Ray's son, Sandip Ray, this character was played by Mohan Agashe, Rabi Ghosh, Anup Kumar and Bibhu Bhattacharya respectively. Jatayu also has a fantasy of collecting weapons. In various books he carried weapons like 'kukri' (Nepali knife), and smoke bomb. Jatayu lives at Garpar in Kolkata, and it may be recalled that Satyajit Ray himself passed his childhood at 100, Garpar.

Sidhu Jetha 
Sidhu Jetha's formal name is Siddheshwar Bose. He is an aged character who has described himself to be like Sherlock Holmes's brother Mycroft, living in Sardar Sankar Road, Lake Market, Kalighat, Kolkata. He is a bibliophile, and has an extensive base of general knowledge, current and historical affairs. He is a close friend of Feluda's father, being former neighbours in their ancestral village in Bangladesh. Feluda's jyatha (that is, uncle) is said to have a 'photographic memory', and is a vast source of information which comes in handy when Feluda is in need of some. His vast knowledge comes from his collection of varied kinds of newspaper clippings which he has accumulated over the years. The role was played by Harindranath Chattopadhyay in Sonar Kella, Ajit Bandopadhyay in Baksho Rahashya, Dibya Bhattacharya in Golapi Mukto Rahashya, Haradhan Banerjee in Kailashe Kelenkari and in Gorosthaney Sabdhan and by Paran Bandyopadhyay in Double Feluda. Following recent Feluda films made by Sandip Ray, Satyajit Ray's son, there have been questions over Sidhu Jyatha's continued relevance in the stories considering technologies such as the internet offer a faster, wider and more effective knowledge base than a well-read person.

Haripada Datta 
Haripada Datta is the driver of Lalmohon Ganguli's second-hand green Mark II Ambassador car. He is a loyal, intelligent and reliable person and is of great help when needed. He played a crucial role in Gorosthaney Sabhdhan where he saved the lives of Feluda, Jatayu, and Topshe. He also has a minor role in Boshpukery Khunkharapi, where he takes part in a surveillance mission with the rest of Feluda's gang in disguise playing 29 cardgame.

Maganlal Meghraj 

Meghraj is a villainous character who appears in three Feluda stories, including Joi Baba Felunath, Joto Kando Kathmandute, and Golapi Mukta Rahasya. He has been compared to Professor Moriarty of the Sherlock Holmes series. Utpal Dutta immortalised this character in one Feluda movie Joi Baba Felunath, which Satyajit Ray directed. After him Mohan Agashe played this character twice in telefilms.

Maganlal lives in Benaras. He has a house in Joka, Kolkata also. His son's name is Surajlal Meghraj. He is officially a money-lender but is involved in smuggling artifacts, narcotics (through Indo-Nepal border) and jewellery. His Kolkata house had been raided once but he escaped any charges until Feluda caught him red-handed in smuggling an invaluable Ganesh Murti (an idol of the elephant god) during the case of Joi Baba Felunath. However, he was not behind bars for a long time. In the nineteenth book, Jato Kando Kathmandute, Feluda said that he was not at all surprised seeing Meghraj out of jail as that was nothing for such an influential person. Once again he was arrested in charge of murder and smuggling, yet he averted any long term punishment and we saw him once again in the thirty-first story, Golapi Mukta Rahasya.

Maganlal is a good judge of human character. He lured Bikash Singh, secretary of Umanath Ghoshal, to steal the invaluable 'Ganesh Murti' from the Ghoshal-house. He also has a special interest in humiliating Jatayu. In Joi Baba Felunath he made Jatayu the subject of a knife-throwing play. In Jato Kando Kathmandute, he purposefully slips an LSD-laced sugar cube in Jatayu's tea. In his third appearance, he made Jatayu to sing a Tagore song (which Jatayu said his first time experience of singing a song). Surprisingly, he shows a queer fondness to Jatayu and usually calls him 'Uncle'.

During these three stories, we see many accomplices of Maganlal. Some of them are Machhli-Baba, Bikash Sinha, Arjun the knife thrower, Anantalaal Bantra, Dr. Dibakar and Manohar. Maganlaal has his own Bajra by which he travels in Ganga near Benaras. The door of his house in Benaras is painted with figures of two swordsmen. During the making of the movie, Joi Baba Felunath, this swordsmen were painted by Satyajit Ray himself.

Pulak Ghoshal 
Ghoshal is a Mumbai-based popular Hindi film director hailing from Kolkata. His original home in Kolkata is in the neighbourhood of Lalmohonbabu's in northern Kolkata's Garpar. He has directed two films based on Lalmohonbabu's stories. During the shooting of both these films, dangerous events took place, resulting in arrest of a producer in one film (Bombaiyer Bombete) and arrest of an actor in another film (Darjeeling Jamjomat).

Minor characters 
 Srinath is the domestic help of Feluda and Topshe. He is often seen serving tea and snacks for Feluda and his clients.
 Jagannath is the household cook at Feluda's place. 
 Bharadwaj is the household cook at Lalmohan Babu's place.
 Baikuntha Nath Mallik was a poet, tourist and Bangla teacher at Ethenium Institution where Lalmohan Babu used to study. When he was in the seventh grade, he won prize for reciting Baikuntha's poem on sea. Lalmohan Babu often describes him as a great poet who did not get the adulation he deserved. There is no presence of him in the story but in some stories we can see Jatayu reciting his poems.

Stories

In other media

Films 
Satyajit Ray directed Sonar Kella (1974) and Joi Baba Felunath (1979) into movies in Bengali, starring actor Soumitra Chatterjee as Feluda, Santosh Dutta as Jatayu and Siddartha Chatterjee as Topshe. This two films created a cult following in Bengali cinema later years.

Until 2011, Sandip Ray directed five Feluda theatrical feature-length films. The first theatrically released Feluda film directed by Ray was Baksho Rahashya (1996) which was the first film of the Feluda TV film series.

Baksho Rahashya (1996) was released in theaters in December 2001. It was made for television release only in 1996, unlike the next five theatrical feature film. This film was the first TV film of Sandip Ray's new Feluda film series which was the continuation of original Feluda film series. In this TV film Sabyasachi Chakrabarty was Feluda, Saswata Chatterjee was Topshe and Rabi Ghosh was Jatayu. All films of the new Feluda film series (the continuation of the original series) were directed by Sandip Ray. In this series he made ten TV films and five full-length films in Bengali on the character.
Bombaiyer Bombete was released in December 2003. In this movie Sabyasachi Chakrabarty reprised his role as Feluda, Parambrata Chatterjee as Topshe and Bibhu Bhattacharya as Jatayu. 
Kailashey Kelenkari was released in December 2007.
Tintorettor Jishu was released in December 2008.
In December 2010, Sandip Ray made another Feluda movie, Gorosthaney Sabdhan. In it, Bibhu Bhattacharyya and Sabyasachi Chakroborty reprised their roles, but Paramabrata was replaced by Saheb Bhattacharyya as Topshe.
 Royal Bengal Rahashya, released in December 2011. It is the last film portraying Bibhu Bhattacharya as Jatayu.
 Badshahi Angti  released in November 2014, in which Abir Chatterjee is playing Feluda for first time. This was going to be a reboot to previous the Feluda film series after Royal Bengal Rahashya. However, in 2016 Sandip Ray cancelled the reboot series because Abir Chatterjee started a new version of film series based on the Byomkesh Bakshi franchise under Shree Venkatesh Films and Surinder Films. The other reason was the new Feluda movie Sandip Ray intended to make under a Mumbai-based production house Eros International, but Abir has a strict contract with Shree Venkatesh Films and Surinder Films. For the cancellation of the reboot series Badshahi Angti is now considered as a stand-alone reboot film. 
 Double Feluda was released in December 2016. It was a continuation of the original Feluda movie series where Sabyasachi Chakrabarty and Saheb Bhattacharya reprised their roles as Feluda and Topshe respectively. The movie consisted of two stories, Samaddar-er-Chabi and Golokdham Rahashya, shown on either half of the movie. It was a tribute to the 50-year anniversary of Feluda and a sequel to Royal Bengal Rahashya (2011).
 A new Feluda film was announced by SVF on 25 December 2021 based on Hatyapuri which would be directed by Sandip Ray, to be released in 2022. But due to internal matters , SVF has backed out of the film.Ghosal and Shadow Films will produce this movie.

Television 
In addition to the feature films, 10 Feluda stories have been filmed by Sandip Ray as television films under the names/packages:

 Kissa Kathmandu Mein (in Hindi, based on Joto Kando Kathmandute for DD National) (1986)
 Ghurghutiyar Ghatona (1992) and Golokdham Rahasya (1992) were directed by Bibhash Chakraborty. 
 Feluda 30 (Baksho Rahashya, Gosaipur Sargaram, Sheyal Devta Rahashya, Bosepukure Khunkharapi, Joto Kando Kathmandu for DD Bangla, Later Repeated in Tara Muzik) (1996–1998)
 Satyajiter Goppo (Jahangirer Swarnamudra, Ghurghutiyar Ghotona, Golapi Mukto Rahashya, Ambar Sen Antardhan Rahashya for DD Bangla) (1999)
 Satyajiter Priyo Golpo (Dr Munshir Diary for ETV Bangla) (2000)
 Noyon Rohossho-Feluda, Feluda is played by versatile actor, Ahmed Rubel, it also stars legendary actor, Abul Hayat. It is directed by actor-director Tauquir Ahmed in 2019.

From 1999 to 2001 Bangladesh Television (BTV) aired nine Feluda TV films. The series gained a huge popularity in Bangladesh.

In the Hindi telefilm Kissa Kathmandu Mein (1985), Feluda was played by Shashi Kapoor, Jatayu by Mohan Agashe, Topshe by Alankar Joshi and Magan Lal Meghraj once again by Utpal Dutt. Feluda was played by Soumitra Chatterjee in two Bengali Feluda telefilms made in 1992, while Sabyasachi Chakrabarty played that role in Feluda telefilms made later. After the death of Santosh Dutta Jatayu was played by Rabi Ghosh in the first two TV films, after his death Anup Kumar played Jatayu and finally by Bibhu Bhattacharya. In Sandip Ray's ten Feluda TV films Topshe was played by Saswata Chatterjee.

Sandip Ray has sold the rights of Feluda stories to Bangladeshi production company Kandy Productions, who are producing a TV series inspired by the original Feluda series. It premiered on Channel i as well as digitally on Bioscopelive from September, 2017. The series will be available in India on the digital platform Addatimes Digital. Dhaka based Kandy Production is producing the series jointly with Top of Mind Creations, another Bangladeshi TV and film production house. Parambrata Chatterjee plays Feluda and Riddhi Sen plays Topshe. The first season of the series is directed by Parambrata Chatterjee.

Web series

 A web show "Feluda" from Addatimes streaming platform was directed by Parambrata Chatterjee who also played the title character along with Riddhi Sen playing Topshe was released in 2017. Stories adapted were Sheyal Debota Rahasyo, Golokdham Rahasya and Ghurghutiyar Ghotona.
 Feluda Pherot (Directed by Srijit Mukherji)
In 2020 a web series is making, named 'Feluda Pherot' based on the iconic Bengali detective and there will be two popular stories, ‘Chhinnamastar Abhishap’ and 'Joto Kando Kathmandute'. Bengali actors Tota Roy Chowdhury is playing the main character 'Feluda' and Kalpan Mitra as 'Topesh' seemed to be the his young assistant and the iconic character Lalmohan Ganguly, alias 'Jatayu' is playing by Anirban Chakraborty who played the main character in Detective Series Eken Babu before.

It will be available to stream on the web platform addatimes. The song which has been sung by Rupankar Bagchi, Rupam Islam and Anupam Roy was out on 2 May 2020 on Srijit Mukherji's Facebook account and Anupam Roy's YouTube channel. The trailer of the Feluda Pherot Season 1 Chhinnamastar Abhishap  is released on 21 November 2020 and the trailer of the Feluda Pherot Season 2 Joto Kando Kathmandute  is released on 22 November 2020.The Season 1 released on 26 December 2020.

Animation 
In 2010 an animated TV film produced by DQE Productions titled Feluda: The Kathmandu Caper was produced and the rights were acquired by Disney Channel (India). The movie premiered on 1 January 2011. DQE Productions also made a 13-episode animation series named Mysteries and Feluda after the animated TV film for Disney XD. The series including the TV film was set into a new universe, where Feluda, Topshe and Jatayu have many gadgets.

Radio 

 The first radio adaptation of Feluda was made by Satyajit Ray in the early 80s, Baksho Rahsaya with his usual cast like Soumitra Chatterjee as Feluda, Santosh Dutta as Jatayu, Siddartha Chatterjee as Topshe and Sushil Majumdar as Sidhu Jyatha along with other prominent actors like Haradhan Bandopadhyay, Biplab Chatterjee and Bikash Roy.
 Akashabani had produced Darjeeling Jomjomat casting a set of regular actors in radio.
 In January 2007, the BBC World Service announced that it would produce at least two 'episodes' of the popular detective stories. Hindi film star Rahul Bose speaks the leading role, with Anupam Kher voicing Lalmohan. The first episode, "The Golden Fortress", aired on 10 February 2007 with the second episode, "The Mystery of the Elephant God", following on 11 August 2007.
 In 2007 Sandip Ray rebooted the radio series with his own set of actors as Sabyasachi Chakrabarty as Feluda, Parambrata Chatterjee as Topshe and Bibhu Bhattacharya as Jatayu. He made two new dramas based on, Gosainpur Sargaram and Dr. Munshir Diary. They with Baksho Rahashya, directed by Satyajit Ray, aired together on Big FM.
 Radio Mirchi Kolkata station airs thrillers in a radio drama format, under the programme name 'Sunday Suspense' which includes some Feluda stories. Feluda is voiced by Sabyasachi Chakrabarty. Dip and Somak voices Topshe and Mir Afsar Ali voices the other characters. Bibhu Bhattacharya voiced Jatayu in only one episode. After Bhattacharya's death Jagannath Basu voices Jatayu.
 Radio Today airs thrillers in a radio format, under the programme name Thursday Nightsaga, which includes some Feluda stories. However, it stopped before finishing the Feluda novel Baksho Rahasya.

Comics 
Some of the Feluda stories have been made into comic strips by artists and authors. Abhijit Chattopadhyay creates a comic strip based on Feluda stories in every Pujabarshiki Anondomela. The comics are published by Ananda Publishers. English versions of comics have appeared in The Telegraph.

Penguin Books has released comic book versions of around 6 Feluda mysteries. The art is drawn by Tapas Guha and the script is by Subhadra Sen Gupta.

Music

In a collaborative album brought out in 1996 by HMV, Kabir Suman sings a 'Feludar Gaan' (Feluda's song). The song written by Kabir Suman was first publicised at Sandesh magazine on the special Feluda 30 issue released in December 1995 on the completion of 30 years of Feluda stories. Later in a collaborative album by HMV Choto Boro Miley (1996) the song was composed and performed by three-legend singer-songwriter Kabir Suman, Nachiketa Chakraborty and Anjan Dutt.

Later many of Bengali songs have references and symbols of Feluda franchise including "Calcium" by Anjan Dutt from the album Purono Guitar (1995).

Documentary
A Bengali documentary film Feluda: 50 Years Of Ray's Detective in 2019 was directed by Sagnik Chatterjee. This is the first biopic of India based on a fictional character. This film was released on 7 June 2019.

In Pujabarshiki 
Nearly every Feluda story was published annually in the Pujabarshiki Desh (the edition of Desh commemorating the Durgapuja published every year). Thereafter the stories were published as hard-back editions by Ananda Publishers. Some of the stories were published originally in Sandesh, a children's magazine co-edited by Satyajit Ray. In 2015 Feluda celebrates his 50 th years after appearance. This is printed as 'Feluda 50' in anandamela.

See also 
 Satyajit Ray
 Sandip Ray
 Feluda in film
 Literary works of Satyajit Ray
 Professor Shonku
 Tarini khuro
 Tarini Khuro in other media
 Parashor Barma
 Kakababu
 Kakababu in other media
 Byomkesh Bakshi
 Byomkesh Bakshi in other media
 Kolkata culture
 Culture of Bengal
 Culture of West Bengal
 Bengali literature
 History of Bengali literature
 List of Bengali-language authors (chronological)

References

External links 
 Feluda Films – BBC, 18 Jan 2010.
 Roy, Pinaki. "The Postcolonial Sleuth for Adoloscents: Rereading Satyajit Ray's Feluda-narratives". Clues: A Journal of Detection (McFarland). 36.1 (Spring 2018): 78–89.

Book series introduced in 1965
Literary characters introduced in 1965
Culture of Kolkata
Fictional private investigators
Indian crime novels
Fictional Indian people
Characters created by Satyajit Ray
Fictional Bengali people
Feluda (series)
Novel series by featured character
Novels set in India
Fictional amateur detectives